Pieter Coecke van Aelst (Aalst, 14 August 1502 – Brussels, 6 December 1550) was a Flemish painter, sculptor, architect, author and designer of woodcuts, goldsmith's work, stained glass and tapestries.  His principal subjects were Christian religious themes.

Below is an incomplete list of Pieter Coecke van Aelst's works:
 Christ and His Disciples on Their Way to Emmaus, Oil on panel, 68 x 87 cm, Private collection
 Descent from the Cross, c. 1535, Oil on panel, 119 x 170 cm, Amstelkring Museum, Amsterdam
 The Adoration of the Magi, Oil on panel, Museo del Prado, Madrid
 Crucifixion, tapestry, Pinacoteca Comunale, Forlì
 Triptych, 1530s, Oil on panel, 105 x 68 cm (central), 105 x 28 cm (each wing), Private collection
 Triptych: Adoration of the Magi, Oil on panel, 89 x 57 cm (central), 89 x 25 cm (each wing), Private collection
 Triptych: Descent from the Cross, 1540–1550, Oil on panel, 262 x 172 cm (central), 274 x 84 cm (each wing), Museu Nacional de Arte Antiga, Lisbon
 Triptych of Saint James the Lesser and Saint Philip, Museu de Arte Sacra do Funchal
 The last Holy Communion, Kroměříž Archbishop's Palace picture gallery, Kroměříž

References

External links

 List of paintings by Pieter Coecke van Aelst

Aelst, Pieter